Segundo (Barrio Segundo) is one of the 31 barrios of the municipality of Ponce, Puerto Rico.  Along with Primero, Tercero, Cuarto, Quinto, and Sexto, Segundo is one of the municipality's six core urban barrios. It was organized in 1878. Barrio Segundo has 3 subbarrios: Baldority de Castro (or just "Baldorioty"), Clausells, and Reparada.

Location
Segundo is an urban barrio located in the southern section of the municipality, within the Ponce city limits, and northwest of the traditional center of the city, Plaza Las Delicias.

Boundaries
Barrio Segundo is bounded on the North by Cinco Street, Pico Dulce Street, and Paseo de la Cruceta, on the South by Villa Street, on the West by Global Street, and on the East by Atocha, Plaza Munoz Rivera, and Plaza Degetau Streets.

In terms of barrio-to-barrio boundaries, Segundo is bounded in the North by Portugués Urbano, in the South by Primero and Canas Urbano, in the West by Canas Urbano, and in the East by Sexto, Quinto, and Tercero.

The communities of Clausells, Ferran, and Tamarindo are located in Segundo.

Features and demographics
Segundo has  of land area and no water area.  In 2000, the population of Segundo was 11,321. In 2010, the population of Segundo was 7,213 persons, and it had a density of 13,609.4 persons per square mile.

Notable landmarks
Segundo is home to a large number of Ponce's landmarks and historic sites. Plaza Las Delicias, 25 de Enero Street, and Paseo Atocha, are located there.

The NRHP-listed Parque de Bombas, Nuestra Señora de la Guadalupe Cathedral, Armstrong-Poventud Residence, Casa Wiechers-Villaronga (Architecture Museum), Panteón Nacional Román Baldorioty de Castro, Albergue Caritativo Tricoche,  Casa Miguel C. Godreau, and Subira House are all located in Barrio Segundo.

Gallery

See also

 List of communities in Puerto Rico

Notes

References

External links

Barrio Segundo
1878 establishments in Puerto Rico